The men's horizontal bar event was part of the gymnastics programme at the 1924 Summer Olympics. It was one of nine gymnastics events and it was contested for the third time after 1896 and 1904. The competition was held on Saturday, July 19, 1924. Seventy-two gymnasts from nine nations competed. The event was won by Leon Štukelj of Yugoslavia, with Jean Gutweninger of Switzerland taking silver and André Higelin of France bronze. It was the first medal in the horizontal bar for each of those nations.

Background

This was the third appearance of the event, which is one of the five apparatus events held every time there were apparatus events at the Summer Olympics (no apparatus events were held in 1900, 1908, 1912, or 1920). The 1922 world championship had ended in a three-way tie; two of the winners were competing in Paris: Leon Štukelj of Yugoslavia and Miroslav Klinger of Czechoslovakia.

Two nations had previously competed, Switzerland in 1896 and the United States in 1904. The other seven nations (Czechoslovakia, Finland, France, Great Britain, Italy, Luxembourg, and Yugoslavia) were competing for the first time.

Competition format

Each gymnast performed a compulsory exercise and a voluntary exercise. These two exercises were 2 of the 11 components of the individual all-around score, and thus were also included in the team all-around score. Each exercise had a maximum possible score of 11, with half a point each for the approach and dismount and up to 10 points for the routine.

Schedule

Results

References

Official Olympic Report
 

Horizontal bar
Men's 1924